The historical toponym County of Glatz, German: Grafschaft Glatz may correspond to:

County of Kladsko
Glatz District
Kłodzko County